Cotylelobium lanceolatum is a tree in the family Dipterocarpaceae. The specific epithet lanceolatum means "lance-like", referring to the shape of the leaf.

Description

Distribution and habitat
Cotylelobium lanceolatum is native to Thailand, Peninsular Malaysia, Singapore and Borneo.

Conservation
Cotylelobium lanceolatum has been assessed as vulnerable on the IUCN Red List. It is threatened by conversion of land for palm oil plantations and other agriculture. The species is found in some protected areas.

References

Dipterocarpaceae
Flora of Borneo
Flora of Malaya
Flora of Thailand
Plants described in 1913
Taxa named by William Grant Craib